The National Museum of Egyptian Civilization (NMEC) is a large museum in the ancient city of Fustat, now part of Cairo, Egypt. Partially opened in 2017, the museum was officially inaugurated on 3 April 2021 by President Abdel Fattah El-Sisi, with the moving of 22 mummies, including 18 kings and four queens, from the Egyptian Museum in central Cairo, in an event termed the Pharaohs' Golden Parade. The museum displays a collection of 50,000 artifacts, presenting the Egyptian civilization from prehistoric times to the present day.

Background

The permanent collection is divided into two separate regions; one chronological and the other is thematic. The chronological areas are the following: Archaic, Pharaonic, Greco-Roman, Coptic, Medieval, Islamic, modern and contemporary. The thematic areas are the following: Dawn of Civilization, The Nile, Writing, State and Society, Material Culture, Beliefs and Thinking and the Gallery of Royal Mummies. UNESCO provided technical help to the museum.

The collections will be taken from other Egyptian museums such as the Egyptian Museum, the Coptic Museum, the Museum of Islamic Art, the Manial Palace and Museum in Cairo, and the Royal Jewelry Museum in Alexandria.

Notable donations
In late 2017, Zahi Hawass reported that Francis Ricciardone, the president of the American University in Cairo, donated 5,000 of its artifacts to the National Museum of Egyptian Civilization.

Usage
The museum hosted the final draw of the 2021 World Men's Handball Championship.

See also
 List of museums of Egyptian antiquities

References

External links
Official website
Podcast on the Golden Parade,  "History of Egypt Podcast" series by Egyptologist Dominic Perry, 4 April 2021

Museums in Cairo
 
Archaeological museums in Egypt
Egyptological collections in Egypt
National museums
Tourist attractions in Egypt
Museums established in 2017
2017 establishments in Egypt
Government agencies of Egypt